The 1799 New Hampshire gubernatorial election took place on March 12, 1799. Incumbent Federalist Governor John Taylor Gilman won re-election to a sixth term.

Results

References 

Gubernatorial
New Hampshire
1799